Alex Caffi (born August 12, 1990) is an Italian ice hockey goaltender. He is currently playing for the VEU Feldkirch in the  Alps Hockey League.

International
Caffi was named to the Italy national ice hockey team for competition at the 2014 IIHF World Championship.

References

External links

1990 births
Living people
Italian ice hockey goaltenders
Sportspeople from Varese
Mississippi RiverKings (SPHL) players
Italian expatriate ice hockey people
Italian expatriate sportspeople in the United States